Joe Watkins (born 27 October 1979) is a retired English ice hockey goaltender from Durham.

He played for Guildford Flames of the English Premier Ice Hockey League. He has played for Sunderland Chiefs of the English Division 1; Telford Tigers, Fife Flyers, Basingstoke Bison in the BNL; Bracknell Bees in the BISL; the now defunct London Racers of the EIHL; Bakersfield Condors in the ECHL; and Amsterdam Bulldogs in the Netherlands. He has also represented Great Britain.

He was awarded the British Ice Hockey Writers Association British Netminder of the Year award in 2002–03 and 2005–06.

References
 

1979 births
Bakersfield Condors (1998–2015) players
Basingstoke Bison players
Bracknell Bees players
English ice hockey goaltenders
Guildford Flames players
London Racers players
Living people